Gianluca Mager and Andrea Pellegrino were the defending champions but chose not to defend their title.

Jay Clarke and Arjun Kadhe won the title after defeating Sebastian Ofner and Nino Serdarušić 6–0, 6–4 in the final.

Seeds

Draw

References

External links
 Main draw

Chennai Open Challenger - Doubles